Wireless payment can refer to:
 Contactless payment in close physical proximity
 Mobile payment on a remote mobile device